Norbert Sárközi (born 5 March 1993 in Budapest) is a Hungarian football player.

Club statistics

Updated to games played as of 30 November 2014.

References
MLSZ

External links
 

1993 births
Living people
Footballers from Budapest
Hungarian footballers
Association football midfielders
Nemzeti Bajnokság I players
Dunaújváros PASE players
FK Csíkszereda Miercurea Ciuc players
Hungarian expatriate footballers
Expatriate footballers in Romania
Hungarian expatriate sportspeople in Romania